Giovanni Kotchev (born 30 May 1999) is an Austrian-Bulgarian footballer who plays as a midfielder for Austrian side USC Grafenwörth.

Career statistics

Club

Notes

References

External link
Giovanni Kotchev at ÖFB

1999 births
Living people
Austrian footballers
Bulgarian footballers
Association football midfielders
SKN St. Pölten players
FC Admira Wacker Mödling players
1. FC Union Berlin players
SV Horn players
FC Mauerwerk players
Austrian Regionalliga players
2. Liga (Austria) players
Expatriate footballers in Germany